Piaoli is a town in Longsheng Various Nationalities Autonomous County, Guangxi, China.

Administrative divisions
As of 2020, the town is divided into 1 residential community and 10 villages.

Residential communities 
The town's sole residential community is Piaolijie Community.

Villages 
The town's 10 villages are as follows:
 Dayun
 Shangtang
 Piaoli
 Jiaozhou
 Liuman
 Jiequan
 Silong
 Meidong
 Pingling
 Menghua

History

In early Qing dynasty (1644–1911), it belonged to Piaolixun and Piaolitang. In late Qing dynasty, it came under the jurisdiction of Xituan.

In the Republic of China, it was under the jurisdiction of the West District, and then Zhengwei Township, and finally Zhenxi Township.

In 1994, it was upgraded to a town.

Geography

The town is located in northwestern Longsheng Various Nationalities Autonomous County. It borders Tongdao Dong Autonomous County in the northwest, Longsheng Town in the east, Sanmen Town in the south, and Sanjiang Dong Autonomous County and Tongdao Dong Autonomous County in the west.

The Xun River runs through the town west to southeast.

Demographics 
The villages of Dayun, Jiaozhou, Liuman, Silong, Meidong, and Menghua are home to concentrations of Zhuang people.

Economy

The economy of the town is supported primarily by farming, ranching and mineral resources. The region are rich in manganese and quartz.

Tourist attractions

Yulongtan Scenic Spot is a famous scenic spot in the town.

Transportation

The G65 Baotou–Maoming Expressway, more commonly known as "Bao-Mao Expressway", passes west to southeast of the town.

The China National Highway 321, commonly referred to as "G321", is a west-southeast highway passing through the town.

References

Bibliography

Towns of Guilin